Rhinyptia infuscata is a species of scarab beetle. It is a pest of millets in Africa.

References

Scarabaeidae
Insect pests of millets